Norway was represented by the Bendik Singers, with the song "It's Just a Game", at the 1973 Eurovision Song Contest, which took place on 7 April in Luxembourg City. "It's Just a Game" was chosen as the Norwegian entry at the Melodi Grand Prix on 17 February.

Before Eurovision

Melodi Grand Prix 1973
The Melodi Grand Prix 1973 was organised by broadcaster NRK at the Château Neuf in Oslo, hosted by Vidar Lønn-Arnesen. Five songs were presented in the final with each song sung twice by different singers, once with a small combo and once with a full orchestra. The winning song was chosen by voting from a 14-member public jury who each awarded between 1 and 5 points per song. "It's Just a Game" was performed in Norwegian at MGP, but with the introduction of the free-language rule in 1973 Norway was one of three countries (along with Finland and Sweden) who took the opportunity to translate their entry into English before the Eurovision final. The Bendik Singers included past and future Norwegian representatives Arne Bendiksen (1964), Anne-Karine Strøm (1974 & 1976) and Ellen Nikolaysen (1975).

At Eurovision 
On the night of the final the Bendik Singers performed 5th in the running order, following Germany and preceding Monaco. "It's Just a Game" was an unusually structured song for Eurovision, featuring jazz-influenced freestyle vocal interplay, and proved distinctive enough to earn Norway its first top 10 placing since 1966, finishing the evening in 7th place with 89 points. This proved to be Norway's only top 10 ranking of the 1970s, and would not be bettered until the victory of Bobbysocks! in 1985.

Voting

References 

1973
Countries in the Eurovision Song Contest 1973
1973
Eurovision
Eurovision